Justice Branch may refer to:

Edward Thomas Branch (1811–1861), associate justice of the Republic of Texas Supreme Court
Joseph Branch (judge) (1915–1991), associate justice and chief justice of the North Carolina Supreme Court
Oliver Winslow Branch (1879–1956), associate justice of the New Hampshire Supreme Court